Ursula is an album by American jazz pianist Mal Waldron recorded in 1969 and released on the French Musica label.

Track listing
All compositions by Mal Waldron except as indicated
 "First Bassman" (Franco Manzecchi) — 2:13   
 "Girl on a Bicycle Waltz" — 6:43   
 "Ursula" — 4:04   
 "Blood and Guts" — 5:08   
 "Drummer's Bags" (Manzecchi) — 2:13   
 "Valse Von Den Puppen" — 4:43   
 "For Mimi" (Manzecchi) — 7:33   
 "Les Parents Terribles" — 7:13 
Recorded in Paris, France, on June 12, 1969.

Personnel
 Mal Waldron — piano 
 Patrice Caratini — bass
 Franco Manzecchi — drums

References

Musica Records albums
Mal Waldron albums
1969 albums